Cil (also, Kazımlı Cil and Dzhil’) is a village and municipality in the Lankaran Rayon of Azerbaijan.  It had a population of 2,279 as of 2007.

Notable natives

 Allahshukur Pashazadeh, Sheikh ul-Islam and Grand Mufti of the Caucasus.

References 

Populated places in Lankaran District